Bryon Friedman (born June 14, 1980) is a former American alpine skier.

Career
During his career he has achieved 3 results among the top 10 in the World Cup.

World Cup results
Top 10

National titles
Friedman has won two national championships at individual senior level.

United States Alpine Ski Championships
Downhill: 2004
Combined: 2004

References

External links
 
 

1980 births
Living people
American male alpine skiers